The 2009 Tim Hortons Brier, the Canadian men's national curling championship, was held March 7–15 at the Pengrowth Saddledome in Calgary.

The Brier was billed as one of the best in history, as it included six former champion skips, as well as the defending Olympic champion Brad Gushue of Newfoundland and Labrador, who had yet to even win a Brier. The former champions included the defending champion Alberta rink, skipped by Kevin Martin, 2007 Brier champion Glenn Howard of Ontario, 2006 champion Jean-Michel Ménard of Quebec, 2004 champion Mark Dacey of Nova Scotia, 1996 & 1999 champion Jeff Stoughton of Manitoba, and 1987 & 1993 champion Russ Howard of New Brunswick (formerly from Ontario). Rounding out the field were Sean Geall of BC, Jamie Koe of the Territories, Joel Jordison of Saskatchewan, Mike Jakubo of Northern Ontario, and Rod MacDonald of PEI.

The Brier was also one of the most attended in history, with nearly 250,000 spectators.

The 2009 Brier featured one of the greatest Brier shots in history, when Glenn Howard made a seemingly impossible in-off "round the clock" double to score three to win his Draw 8 match against Saskatchewan. The Brier also featured one of the greatest games in history, between Ontario and Alberta in Draw 17. The Brier also included three "perfect" games where players scored 100%, including Kevin Martin in Draw 13.

Prior to the Brier, Sweep magazine gave both Alberta and Ontario 2:1 odds to win it. Many had expected a rematch of the 2008 Brier final between these two teams, and after the round robin, these teams finished first and second in the round robin. Alberta was undefeated while Ontario lost their final game to Alberta and an earlier match against Quebec. The two teams faced off in the 1 vs. 2 page playoff game, with Alberta's win putting them into the final, and sending Ontario to play Manitoba in the semi-final. Manitoba won this game in an upset, giving them the right to face the defending champions in the final.

Teams

Round-robin standings
Final round-robin standings

Results
All draw times are listed in Mountain Standard Time (UTC−7).

Draw 1
Saturday, March 7, 13:00

Draw 2
Saturday, March 7, 18:00

Draw 3
Sunday, March 8, 8:30

Draw 4
Sunday, March 8, 13:00

Draw 5
Sunday, March 8, 18:30

Draw 6
Monday, March 9, 8:30

Draw 7
Monday, March 9, 13:00

Draw 8

Monday, March 9, 18:30

Draw 9
Tuesday, March 10, 8:30

Draw 10
Tuesday, March 10, 13:00

Draw 11
Tuesday, March 10, 18:30

Draw 12
Wednesday, March 11, 8:30

Draw 13
Wednesday, March 11, 13:00

Draw 14
Wednesday, March 11, 18:30

Draw 15
Thursday, March 12, 8:30

Draw 16
Thursday, March 12, 13:00

Draw 17

Thursday, March 12, 18:30

Tiebreaker
Friday, March 13, 13:00

Playoffs

1 vs. 2
Friday, March 13, 18:00

3 vs. 4
Saturday, March 14, 10:00

Semifinal
Saturday, March 14, 18:00

Final
Sunday, March 15, 18:00

Statistics

Top 5 player percentages
Round Robin only

See also
 2009 Scotties Tournament of Hearts
 2009 Canadian Olympic Curling Trials

References

External links

Curling Scoops 2009 Brier Coverage

 
Curling competitions in Calgary
The Brier
2009 in Alberta
2009 in Canadian curling